The 2010 British Speedway Championship was the 50th edition of the British Speedway Championship. The Final took place on 14 June at Monmore Green in Wolverhampton, England. The Championship was won by defending champion Chris Harris, who beat Scott Nicholls, Ben Barker and Daniel King in the final heat. It was the third time Harris had won the title.

Results

Semi-Final 1 
  Owlerton Stadium, Sheffield
 6 May 2010

 The meeting was abandoned after 12 heats due to rain. Result stood.

Semi-Final 2 
  King's Lynn
 12 May 2010

The Final 
  Wolverhampton
 14 June 2010

See also 
 British Speedway Championship

References 

British Speedway Championship
Great Britain